West Orchard is a small village and civil parish in the county of Dorset in southern England. It is situated in the Blackmore Vale in the North Dorset administrative district, approximately halfway between the towns of Shaftesbury and Sturminster Newton. It is separated from the adjacent settlement of East Orchard by a stream. In 2013 the civil parish had an estimated population of 50. For local government purposes the parish is grouped with the parishes of East Orchard and Margaret Marsh, to form a Group Parish Council.

St Luke's Church was rebuilt in 1876–77 to the designs of Thomas Henry Wyatt, but the chancel is 15th-century.

References

External links 

Villages in Dorset
Civil parishes in Dorset